Lewis Blackbird (born 21 February 1987) is a former motorcycle speedway rider from England.

Biography
Born in Peterborough, Lewis is the son of Carl Blackbird and nephew of Mark Blackbird and Paul Blackbird, all former riders. Before taking up speedway, he rode in motocross from the age of fourteen. After one appearance for Sittingbourne Crusaders in 2006 and two for Oxford Lions in 2007, he competed in mini-bike racing in 2008, winning the 88cc British Championship. In 2010 he bought a speedway bike and returned to the sport. He was signed to ride for King's Lynn Young Stars National League team in 2011, but transferred to Mildenhall Fen Tigers before the season started. He was part of the team that won the National League Knock Out Cup in 2011. He more than doubled his starting average in 2011, also making several guest appearances in the Premier League, and rode in the Midland Development League for Long Eaton Invaders. He started the 2012 season as the Fen Tigers team captain. His good form continued in 2012, although a dislocated shoulder sustained in a fall at King's Lynn in May kept him out for a few weeks.

An injury to Simon Nielsen in June 2012 saw Blackbird guest again in the Premier League for Leicester Lions, going on to be declared in the team for the remainder of the season in July. 

In July 2012, with Cameron Heeps he won the National League Pairs Championship for Mildenhall. With Mildenhall he also won the National League title, the National League Knock Out Cup, the National League Fours, and the National League Trophy in 2012.

On 25 November 2012 it was announced that he had re-signed with Leicester Lions for the full 2013 Premier League season. Shortly afterwards it was announced that he had also signed to ride for Dudley Heathens in the National League in 2013. In May 2013, after Lions signed Robert Branford to share his number 7 position, he was allowed to move to Scunthorpe Scorpions.

In 2014 he rode for his home town team Peterborough Panthers in the Premier League and Eastbourne Eagles in the Elite League. He stayed with the Panthers in 2015 and rode for Wolverhampton Wolves in the Elite League. On 20 August 2015, after the latest of several crashed during the season, Blackbird announced his retirement from the sport with immediate effect.

References

1987 births
Living people
English motorcycle racers
British speedway riders
Leicester Lions riders
Mildenhall Fen Tigers riders
Cradley Heathens riders
Scunthorpe Scorpions riders
Peterborough Panthers riders
Eastbourne Eagles riders